Daniel Payne (born August 4, 1972) is a Canadian actor best known for playing the role of John in the television series Alice, I Think.

Career
In his early 20s, Payne was a professional volleyball player. After his retirement, he was convinced by his brother Josh to move to Australia, where Josh was already living. Dan began his acting career by creating short films with his brother.

Payne then moved to the United Kingdom, where he supported himself playing, in his words, "the big, dumb American" in various British films and TV shows. He moved to Vancouver in 2001.

Payne had numerous roles on the 2002-2005 science fiction series Stargate SG-1, and its 2004-2009 spin-off series Stargate Atlantis, both shot in Vancouver; these included Kull Warriors and an Ashrak assassin on Stargate SG-1, and the Wraith king in the Stargate Atlantis episode "Sateda". Payne appeared as Nathan Davidson, a married, sexually-repressed father in the 2008 film Mulligans, a role of which Payne stated in 2016, "It is still one of my proudest efforts".  He also appeared as Dollar Bill in Watchmen (2009).

Payne starred as Cesar Divine in the web based television series Divine:The Series that stretched four episodes.

Payne has starring roles in Hallmark Channel's 2016 movies All Yours, with Nicollette Sheridan and A Time To Dance, with Jennie Garth. Payne also landed a recurring role on Good Witch.

Filmography

References

External links

Official website

1972 births
Canadian male film actors
Canadian male television actors
Canadian male voice actors
Living people
Male actors from Victoria, British Columbia
Canadian emigrants to Australia